The 1977 British National Track Championships were a series of track cycling competitions held from 5–13 August 1977 at the Leicester Velodrome. The Championships were sponsored by Newmark and the championships suffered two cancelled days due to rain.

Medal summary

Men's Events

Women's Events

References

1977 in British sport
August 1977 sports events in the United Kingdom